In a Woman's Power is a 1913 Comedy film directed by Herbert Brenon.

Cast

External links

1913 films
American silent short films
American black-and-white films
Silent American comedy films
1913 comedy films
1913 short films
American comedy short films
1910s American films